Luigi Menti (1 October 1934 – 11 December 2013) was an Italian footballer who primarily played as a midfielder.

Luigi Menti died on 11 December 2013, aged 79, in Vicenza, Veneto, Italy.

References

1934 births
2013 deaths
Sportspeople from Vicenza
Italian footballers
Association football midfielders
Footballers from Veneto
L.R. Vicenza players
Serie B players
Serie A players